Mat Luamanu (born 25 November 1988) is a New Zealand rugby union player for Bayonne in the Top 14.

Luamanu played representative rugby for Wellington from Under-16 through to the Under-21 level, and also played for the Hurricanes Schools team for two years. He represented New Zealand Schools and New Zealand Under-20s, winning the 2008 IRB Junior World Championship in Wales.

He made his provincial debut for Wellington in 2008. Luamanu switched from Wellington to North Harbour for the 2010 ITM Cup, Luamanu shone, scoring hat-tricks on two occasions. Luamanu had a superb season with North Harbour in 2010 NPC competition and was rewarded with selection to the Blues squad in 2011.

Luamanu played four games in Super Rugby in 2011 but found his route blocked by the presence of Jerome Kaino. He subsequently had another fantastic season of NPC rugby in 2011 for North Harbour which saw him receiving offers in France and Japan. He opted for Japan and played the 2012–13 and 2013–14 season for Kyuden Voltex in the Top League.

A move to northern Italy was next for 2014–15 season as Luamanu joined Benetton Treviso to play in the Pro12 and European Rugby Champions Cup. Luamanu made his move to England to join Harlequins in the Aviva Premiership from the 2015–16 season.

On 11 June 2019, Luamanu travels to France to sign for Bayonne in the Top 14 competition from the 2019–20 season.

References

External links
 

1988 births
Living people
New Zealand rugby union players
Harlequin F.C. players
Benetton Rugby players
Rugby union players from Wellington City
New Zealand expatriate sportspeople in England
Rugby union locks
Rugby union flankers
Rugby union number eights